North Dakota Highway 73 (ND 73) is a  east–west state highway in the U.S. state of North Dakota. ND 97's western terminus is at ND 23 east of Watford City, and the eastern terminus is at ND 22 north of Mandaree.

Major intersections

References

073
Transportation in McKenzie County, North Dakota